Leonard Arthur Goulden (16 July 1912 – 14 February 1995) was an English footballer, born at Homerton, in Hackney, London, and raised in nearby Plaistow.
His son Roy was also a footballer.

Club playing career
Goulden signed for West Ham United as an amateur in 1931, but was sent out to Chelmsford City and Leyton to gain experience. During this time he supported himself by working at the Tate & Lyle sugar refinery in Silvertown. He signed professional forms with West Ham in 1933 and remained with the Hammers for six years, making over 250 appearances and scoring 55 goals from the inside-left position. He was an ever-present, along with Joe Cockroft, during the 1936–37 season.

His West Ham career was interrupted when World War II started and he never played another competitive match for the club, though he did win the Football League War Cup with them in 1940.

Following the conflict, he signed with west Londoners Chelsea for £4,500 and linked up well with fellow new signings Tommy Lawton and Tommy Walker – the trio scored 47 goals between them in 1946–47 – though the side failed to make to challenge for honours, coming closest in the FA Cup, when they lost to Arsenal in the semi-finals, despite having led 2–0. Goulden retired as a player in 1950, having made 111 Chelsea appearances and scored 17 goals.

International career

Appearances and goals
Goulden won 14 England caps while a West Ham player, scoring four goals. He made his debut on 14 May 1937, against Norway in Oslo. England won 6-0 with Goulden scoring in the 85th minute; barging through the defence he scored with a left foot shot.

He also appeared in several wartime internationals, but these are not considered official full international matches.

Berlin 1938
The match against Germany in Berlin in 1938 is notorious because the England team were pressured by the Foreign Office into giving the Nazi salute while the German national anthem was played. The team were furious:

However, the British ambassador, Neville Henderson, insisted, believing that doing so would help defuse dangerously high international tensions.

There were 110,000 Germans watching the game, including Hermann Goering and Josef Goebbels, and Hitler had hoped to use the game for propaganda, in part because the German side included a player from the newly annexed Austria. Hitler was expected at the game, but it is believed that he did not attend.

Goulden, who was Jewish, and normally known for his creativity rather than his shooting ability; scored the final goal in England's 6–3 victory, a goal has been described as the East End's Jesse Owens moment and which teammate Stanley Matthews described as probably the greatest goal I ever saw.

Other notable matches
A week after the Berlin game, England played Switzerland at Sportplatz Hardturm in Zurich. The match was started by a drop ball released from an aircraft - after circling the stadium, the aeroplane swooped over the pitch releasing the ball which landed almost exactly on the centre circle. The match finished 1-1.

On 26th October 1938, England played a Rest of Europe side managed by Vittorio Pozzo at Highbury in London, to celebrate the 75th anniversary of the Football Association. The match was the second ever to be shown on live on TV, though only the first half was shown. Goulden scored the final goal in a 3-0 victory. Sixty three years later, in 2001, FIFA retrospectively downgraded the match to unofficial, though the FA disputes this decision and continues to treat the match as official.

Coaching and management
He remained at Chelsea until 1952, before moving to Hertfordshire in November 1952 for a management opportunity at Watford. His first match in charge was a 1–1 draw at home to Coventry, and by the end of 1952–53 Goulden had guided his team to a top-10 finish in the Third Division South. That summer he signed Dave Bewley, Roy Brown and Maurice Cook, all of whom went on to play key roles during his reign. After guiding Watford to 4th and 7th in the next two campaigns, Goulden stepped down to become a coach midway through the 1955–56 season. However, his successor and former player Johnny Paton's spell yielded just 2 wins from 15 games, including defeat at the hands of non-league clubs Aldershot and Bedford Town. Goulden took over for the remainder of the season, but was only able to salvage a 21st-placed finish.

After three years coaching overseas, Goulden returned to Watford in 1959, as part of new manager Ron Burgess's coaching staff. Burgess and Goulden's impact was immediate; Watford won promotion from the Fourth Division in 1960, and very nearly a second consecutive promotion in 1961. Goulden departed the following season, again coaching overseas, before returning to management in England with Banbury United in 1965. Goulden, assisted by his former player Maurice Cook, helped Banbury reach the Southern League for the first time in their history. After leaving in 1967, Goulden's final role in football came at Oxford United, where he managed the reserve team from 1969.

Goulden died on 14 February 1995, in Plaistow, London.

References

External links
 Profile at englandstats.com
 Len Goulden Photographs

1912 births
Footballers from Hackney Central
1995 deaths
English footballers
England international footballers
England wartime international footballers
Association football inside forwards
Chelmsford City F.C. players
Leyton F.C. players
Chelsea F.C. players
West Ham United F.C. players
English Football League players
English Football League representative players
Arsenal F.C. wartime guest players
English football managers
Watford F.C. managers
Banbury United F.C. managers
English Football League managers
Chelsea F.C. non-playing staff
Oxford United F.C. non-playing staff
Association football coaches
Chelmsford City F.C. non-playing staff